Pasumpahan is an island in the sub-district of Bungus, West Sumatra Province, Indonesia.

Located 200 m from Sikuai Island, tourism sites in Pasumpahan include white sand beaches and coral reefs.

Islands of Sumatra
Populated places in Indonesia